Kashakovo (Käşäk) is a rural locality (a village) in Chekmagushevsky District, Bashkortostan, Russia. The population was 124 as of 2010. There are 2 streets.

Geography 
Kashakovo is located 10 km northeast of Chekmagush (the district's administrative centre) by road. Syryshbashevo is the nearest rural locality.

References 

Rural localities in Chekmagushevsky District